The Oxford Companion to Food is an encyclopedia about food. It was edited by Alan Davidson and published by Oxford University Press in 1999.  It was also issued in softcover under the name The Penguin Companion to Food. The second and third editions were edited by Tom Jaine and published by Oxford in 2006 and 2014.

The book, Davidson's magnum opus with "more than a million words, mostly his own", covers the nature and history of foodstuffs worldwide, starting from aardvark and ending with zuppa inglese. It is compiled with especially strong coverage of European and in particular British cookery and contains no recipes.  It was an "outgrowth" of the annual Oxford Symposium on Food and Cookery.

The entry for this work in WorldCat includes the following abstract:

Major articles are signed and include bibliographic references, and there is a comprehensive overall bibliography. Some of the material in it was previously published in Davidson's Petits Propos Culinaires.

Editions
 
 
  (later reprints)

Reception
The New York Times called the book "a masterly work with a variety of voices, from the straightforward, almost dry, to the quirky and the witty" and a work "dense with extremely thorough and well-written entries, enhanced by cross-references and indexes and larded with anecdotes and strong opinions."

The American Library Association recognized The Oxford Companion to Food with an Honorable Mention in the Dartmouth Medal competition for 2000, as well as inclusion as one of its Outstanding reference sources 2000 by the Reference Sources Committee of the Reference and User Services Association (RULA).   In May 2000, it received a James Beard Foundation Award as best reference work.

References

1999 non-fiction books
Books about food and drink
Encyclopedias of culture and ethnicity
English-language books
English non-fiction books
Oxford University Press reference books
Penguin Books books